is a Japanese manga series written and illustrated by Aki Mochida. It has been serialized in Shodensha's josei manga magazine Feel Young since July 2020.

Publication
Shodensha has collected its chapters into individual tankōbon volumes. The first volume was released on March 8, 2021. As of July 8, 2022, three volumes have been released.

Volume list

Reception
The series won the Grand Prize at the 25th Japan Media Arts Festival in 2022.

References

Further reading

External links
  

Josei manga
Shodensha manga